Armstrong Township may refer to several places in the United States:

Armstrong Township, Vanderburgh County, Indiana
Armstrong Township, Indiana County, Pennsylvania
Armstrong Township, Lycoming County, Pennsylvania

See also 

Armstrong (disambiguation)

Township name disambiguation pages